Tamara Ustinov (born 1945) is a British actress known for the films The Blood on Satan's Claw (1970), Blood from the Mummy's Tomb (1971), and The Last Horror Movie (2003).

Career 
Ustinov appeared in the films The Blood on Satan's Claw (1970), Blood from the Mummy's Tomb (1971), and The Last Horror Movie (2003). In 2003, she appeared as the "Bride's mother" in The Last Horror Movie.

Personal life
Ustinov is the only child of Peter Ustinov and Isolde Denham (1920–1987), daughter of Reginald Denham and Moyna Macgill. Her parents' marriage lasted from 1940 to their divorce in 1950. She is the half-niece of Dame Angela Lansbury (Tamara's mother, Isolde, was the half-sister of Angela Lansbury, who appeared with Peter Ustinov in Death on the Nile, 1978). Her father's estate has been in a protracted dispute between her half-brother, the sculptor , and her father's third wife.

Tamara Ustinov has been married to Malcolm Rennie since 1989.

Filmography

Film

Television

References

External links 
 

1945 births
Living people
20th-century British actresses
21st-century British actresses
British actresses
English people of Ethiopian descent
English people of French descent
English people of German descent
English people of Irish descent
English people of Italian descent
English people of Polish-Jewish descent
English people of Russian descent
English people of Scottish descent
English people of Swiss descent
Ustinov family